Rourkela Law College is a privately aided co-aid law school located in Nayabazar of sector 21 in the city of Rourkela. Rourkela Law school was established in the year 1974 which is affiliated to Sambalpur University and Bar Council of India (BCI). The school offers law students three years regular course for undergraduate degree of LLB.

See also
 Common Law Admission Test
 Legal Education in India
 Autonomous law schools in India

References

External links
  barcouncilofindia
 allindiabarexamination

Department of Higher Education, Odisha
Law schools in Odisha
Universities and colleges in Rourkela
Educational institutions established in 1974
1974 establishments in Orissa